Lev Nikolayevich Korchebokov (11 March 1907 in Tsarskoye Selo – 16 September 1971 in Riga) was a Soviet and Russian football player and manager.

Honours as a player
Soviet Top League champion: 1936 (spring), 1937.
Soviet Cup winner: 1937.

External links
 

1907 births
1971 deaths
People from Pushkin, Saint Petersburg
People from Tsarskoselsky Uyezd
Dynamo Moscow players
FC Dinamo Minsk managers
FC Dynamo Kyiv managers
FC Dynamo Moscow managers
FC Dynamo Moscow players
FC Sokol Saratov managers
FK Daugava Rīga managers
FK Liepājas Metalurgs managers
Honoured Masters of Sport of the USSR
Recipients of the Order of the Red Banner of Labour
Association football defenders
Soviet bandy players
Soviet football managers
Soviet footballers
Soviet Top League players